This is a list of Quebec media.

News services
 CNW Telbec
 La Presse Canadienne

Newspapers

Daily
 24 Heures (Quebecor)
 Le Devoir (independent)
 Le Droit   produced in Ottawa, but also distributed in Gatineau and elsewhere in Outaouais
 La Presse (independent) online-only since 2018
 Le Soleil (Quebec) 
 La Tribune (Sherbrooke) 
 La Voix de l'Est (Granby) 
 Le Nouvelliste (Trois-Rivières) 
 Le Quotidien (Saguenay) 
 Le Journal de Montréal (Quebecor)
 Le Journal de Québec (Quebecor)
 Montreal Gazette (Postmedia) In the English language. 
 Métro (TC Transcontinental)
 North Shore News In the English language. Ended September 4, 1980.
 The Record (Sherbrooke) (Alta Newspaper Group)

Weekly
 Les Affaires (TC Transcontinental)
 Voir (Communications Voir)
 Hour Community (defunct 2012)
 Montreal Mirror (defunct 2012)
 Westmount Examiner (defunct 2015)
 West Island Chronicle (defunct 2015)
 Quebec Chronicle-Telegraph
 The Suburban

Monthly
 L'aut'journal (independent)
 L'Action nationale (independent)
 Le Québécois (independent)
 Cult MTL (independent)

University and CEGEP
 Concordia University
 The Link
 The Concordian
 L'Organe
 Université du Québec à Montréal
 Montréal Campus 
 Université de Montréal
  
 Forum
 Le Polyscope (École Polytechnique de Montréal)
 L'intérêt (École des Hautes Études Commerciales de Montréal)
 McGill University
 TVMcGill
 McGill Reporter
 McGill Tribune
 The McGill Daily
 Le Délit français
 Bishop's University
 The Campus
 Université de Sherbrooke 
 Le Collectif
 Université Laval 
 Impact Campus
 La Marmite sociale
 Le Fil des évènements
 Université du Québec à Chicoutimi
 Le Griffonnier
 Cégep Régional de Lanaudière à Joliette
 Le Détour
 Cégep du Vieux Montréal
 Le Bagou
 L'ultimatum
 Le p'tit vieux
 Cégep John Abbott
Dawson College
The Plant

Magazines

General interest
 L'actualité
 L'Agora
 Maisonneuve
 http://bestkeptmontreal.com/ (online magazine)

Literary and cultural
 Liberté Nouveau ProjetWomen
 ChâtelaineHumour
 Safarir UrbaniaLiterature
 Nuit blanche SolarisCinema
 24 images Hors Champ Séquences''

Television

Radio

Internet

Monthly
 Alternatives

See also

 Culture of Quebec
 List of Quebec television series
 Politics of Quebec
 Quebec

References

Quebec
 
Media